Escalator over the Hill (or EOTH) is mostly referred to as a jazz opera, but it was released as a "chronotransduction", with "words by Paul Haines, adaptation and music by Carla Bley, production and coordination by Michael Mantler", performed by the Jazz Composer's Orchestra.

History
Escalator over the Hill is more than an hour and a half long and was recorded over three years (1968 to 1971). It was originally released as a triple LP box which also contained a booklet with lyrics, photos and profiles of the musicians. Side six of the original LPs ended in a locked groove, the final track "...And It's Again" continuing infinitely on manual record players. (For the CD reissue, the hum is allowed to play for almost 20 minutes before slowly fading out.)

In 1997, a live version of Escalator over the Hill, re-orchestrated by Jeff Friedman, was performed for the first time in Cologne, Germany. In 1998, "Escalator" toured Europe. Another live performance took place in May 2006 in Essen, Germany.

The musicians involved in the original recording play in various combinations, covering a wide range of musical genres, from Kurt Weill's theater music, to free jazz, rock and Indian music. Writer Stuart Broomer considers this to be a summing up "much of the creative energy that was loose between 1968 and 1972".

Viva acts as narrator. Jack Bruce also appears on bass and vocals (due to the album's long production, he also appeared on Frank Zappa's album Apostrophe, playing bass on the title track). Among the vocalists is a young (and still relatively unknown) Linda Ronstadt, in addition to Jeanne Lee, Paul Jones, Carla Bley, Don Preston, Sheila Jordan, and Bley's and Mantler's then-4-year-old daughter Karen Mantler.

Reception
Jonathon Cott's Rolling Stone article stated: "Like an electric transformer, Escalator Over the Hill synthesizes and draws on an enormous range of musical materials – raga, jazz, rock, ring modulated piano sounds, all brought together through Carla Bley's extraordinary formal sense and ability to unify individual but diverse musical sections by means of the editing of the record medium... The opera is an international musical encounter of the first order."

Marcello Carlin, writing for Stylus Magazine, considers the album to be "the greatest record ever made." He said: "No protest, no social commentary. No expression of love, of grief, of hope, of despair. It is literally whatever you want to make of it. It is devoid of every quality which you might assume would qualify it to be the greatest of all records. And yet it is that tabula rasa in its heart, the blank space which may well exist at the very heart of all music, revealing the hard truth that we have to fill in the blanks, we have to interpret what is being played and sung, and our interpretation is the only one which can possibly be valid, as we cannot discern any perspective other than our own."

Track listing
Side one
"Hotel Overture" – 13:11	
Side two
"This Is Here..." – 6:02	
"Like Animals" – 1:21	
"Escalator over the Hill" – 4:57	
"Stay Awake" – 1:31	
"Ginger and David" – 1:39
"Song to Anything That Moves" – 2:22
Side three
"Eoth Theme" – 0:35
"Businessmen" – 5:38
"Ginger and David Theme" – 0:57
"Why" – 2:19
"It's Not What You Do" – 0:17
"Detective Writer Daughter" – 3:16
"Doctor Why" – 1:28
"Slow Dance (Transductory Music)" – 1:50
"Smalltown Agonist" – 5:24
Side four
"End of Head" – 0:38
"Over Her Head" – 2:38
"Little Pony Soldier" – 4:36
"Oh Say Can You Do?" – 1:11
"Holiday in Risk" – 3:10
"Holiday in Risk Theme" – 0:52
Side five
"A.I.R. (All India Radio)" – 3:58
"Rawalpindi Blues" – 12:44
Side six
"End of Rawalpindi" – 9:40
"End of Animals" – 1:26
"... And It's Again" – 9:55

"... And It's Again" would later be expanded to a length of 27:17 for CD release, with 17:23 minutes of the humming sound found on the inner groove of the LP.

Personnel

Principal cast
 Jack, Parrot: Jack Bruce
 Leader, Mutant, Voice, Desert Women: Carla Bley
 Sand Shepherd: Don Cherry
 Ginger: Linda Ronstadt
 Ginger II: Jeanne Lee
 David: Paul Jones
 Doctor, Lion: Don Preston
 Viva: Viva
 Cecil Clark: Tod Papageorge
 His Friends: Charlie Haden, Steve Ferguson
 Calliope Bill: Bill Leonard
 Roomer: Bob Stewart
 Ancient Roomer: Karen Mantler
 Loudspeaker: Roswell Rudd
 Used Woman: Sheila Jordan
 Operasinger: Rosalind Hupp
 Nurse: Jane Blackstone
 Yodelling Ventriloquist: Howard Johnson
 Therapist: Timothy Marquand
 Dad: Perry Robinson
 Phantoms, Multiple Public Members, Hotelpeople, Women, Men, Flies, Bullfrogs, Mindsweepers, Speakers, Blindman:
Jane Blackstone, Carla Bley, Jonathan Cott, Sharon Freeman, Steve Gebhardt, Tyrus Gerlach, Eileen Hale, Rosalind Hupp, Jack Jeffers, Howard Johnson, Sheila Jordan, Michael Mantler, Timothy Marquand, Nancy Newton, Tod Papageorge, Don Preston, Bill Roughen, Phyllis Schneider, Bob Stewart, Pat Stewart, Viva

Musicians (alphabetical)
 Gato Barbieri – tenor saxophone
 Souren Baronian – clarinet
 Karl Berger – vibraphone
 Carla Bley – organ, celeste, chimes, calliope, piano
 Sam Brown – guitar
 Jack Bruce – bass, vocal
 John Buckingham – tuba
 Sam Burtis – trombone
 Bob Carlisle – French horn
 Don Cherry – trumpet
 Roger Dawson – congas, xylophone
 Sharon Freeman – French horn
 Charlie Haden – bass
 Peggy Imig – clarinet
 Jack Jeffers – bass trombone
 Leroy Jenkins – violin
 Howard Johnson – tuba
 Sheila Jordan – vocal
 Jimmy Knepper – trombone
 Jeanne Lee – vocal
 Jimmy Lyons – alto saxophone
 Michael Mantler – prepared piano, trumpet, valve trombone
 Ron McClure – bass
 John McLaughlin – guitar
 Bill Morimando – orchestra bells, celeste
 Paul Motian – drums, dumbec
 Nancy Newton – viola
 Don Preston – Moog synthesizer
 Enrico Rava – trumpet
 Perry Robinson – clarinet
 Linda Ronstadt – vocal
 Roswell Rudd – trombone
 Calo Scott – cello
 Michael Snow – trumpet
 Chris Woods – baritone saxophone
 Richard Youngstein – bass

Musicians (chronotransductional)

Orchestra (& Hotel Lobby Band)
 Carla Bley (piano)
 Jimmy Lyons (alto saxophone)
 Gato Barbieri (tenor saxophone)
 Chris Woods (baritone saxophone)
 Michael Mantler, Enrico Rava (trumpet)
 Roswell Rudd, Sam Burtis, Jimmy Knepper (trombone)
 Jack Jeffers (bass trombone)
 Bob Carlisle, Sharon Freeman (French horn)
 John Buckingham (tuba)
 Nancy Newton (viola)
 Karl Berger (vibraphone)
 Charlie Haden (bass)
 Paul Motian (drums)
 Roger Dawson (congas)
 Bill Morimando (orchestra bells, celeste).

Jack's Traveling Band
 Carla Bley (organ)
 John McLaughlin (guitar)
 Jack Bruce (bass)
 Paul Motian (drums)

Desert Band
 Carla Bley (organ)
 Don Cherry (trumpet)
 Souren Baronian (clarinet)
 Leroy Jenkins (violin)
 Calo Scott (cello)
 Sam Brown (guitar)
 Ron McClure (bass)
 Paul Motian (dumbec)

Original Hotel Amateur Band
 Carla Bley (piano)
 Michael Snow (trumpet)
 Michael Mantler (valve trombone)
 Howard Johnson (tuba)
 Perry Robinson, Peggy Imig (clarinet)
 Nancy Newton (viola)
 Richard Youngstein (bass)
 Paul Motian (drums)

Phantom Music
 Carla Bley (organ, celeste, chimes, calliope)
 Michael Mantler (prepared piano)
 Don Preston (Moog synthesizer)

Awards
 Jazz Album of the Year 1972 by a Melody Maker Readers Poll
 Oscar du meilleur disque de jazz moderne (best modern jazz album) in 1972, given by the Académie du Jazz.

References

External links 
Karen Mantler Biography at www.wattxtrawatt.com – the Official Carla Bley Web Site
Jazz Composers Orchestra: Escalator Over the Hill at www.jazzdiscography.com
Accomplishing Escalator Over the Hill by Carla Bley. Written in 1972 shortly after the release of the Escalator
The Jazz Composer's Orchestra Information Page
film clips @ The John McLaughlin Archives
Album booklet

Jazz Composer's Orchestra albums
Concept albums
Carla Bley albums
Experimental big band albums
Post-bop albums
Avant-garde jazz albums
1971 albums
Albums produced by Michael Mantler
Paul Haines (poet) albums
Rock operas
Operas by Carla Bley